John William Smit, OIS, (born 3 April 1978) is a former South African rugby union player and former chief executive officer of the Sharks. He was the 50th captain of the South Africa national team, and led the team to win the 2007 Rugby World Cup. He played most of his senior career as a hooker, but also won 13 caps as a prop, where he had also played for South Africa's under-21 team. He retired from international rugby following the 2011 Rugby World Cup as the most-capped South African player ever, with 111 appearances.

Smit was inducted into the IRB Hall of Fame on 24 October 2011 (while still active at club level), alongside all other World Cup-winning captains and head coaches from the tournament's inception in 1987 through 2007 (minus the previously inducted John Eales).

Early life 
Born 3 April 1978 in Pietersburg, South Africa, Smit attended Fields College (then Fields Primary School) in Rustenburg and then went on to Pretoria Boys High School where he was head prefect in 1996 and played for the school's first XV from 1994 to 1996.

Springbok career 
Smit played his first Springbok game in 2000 at the age of 22, when South Africa beat Canada 51–18 at Basil Kenyon Stadium in East London. Between October 2003 and June 2007, Smit played in a record 46 consecutive Test matches for South Africa, though it was not until 2004, when he was made captain of the squad by then new coach Jake White, that he became a regular member of the starting XV.

Smit's record-breaking sequence of appearances came to an end with South Africa's first match of the 2007 Tri Nations, against Australia, when he suffered an injury that prevented him taking any further part in the tournament. He recovered from his injury in time to take part in the 2007 Rugby World Cup, in which he started in 6 out of 7 South African matches and in which his leadership qualities came to the fore, saw South Africa win the William Web Ellis Trophy for the second time.

When Peter de Villiers was appointed as the new South Africa coach in 2008, one of his first decisions was to re-appoint Smit as the captain of the national side. Smit led South Africa in their opening game of the 2008 Tri Nations, against New Zealand in Wellington, but suffered a groin injury when he was lifted and dumped by New Zealand lock Brad Thorn after the whistle had blown: Thorn received a one-match suspension but Smit missed the rest of the tournament, being replaced as captain by veteran Springbok lock, Victor Matfield.

In 2009, Smit led South Africa to a series victory against the visiting British & Irish Lions, and followed this by leading his team to success in the 2009 Tri Nations, in which South Africa won five of their six matches, including a clean sweep of three wins against New Zealand.

In the first test against New Zealand, Smit equalled the record of 59 Tests as captain held by Australia's George Gregan and England's Will Carling. The following week, he became the most-capped captain in international rugby history.

As of September 2009, Smit is one of South Africa's most successful captains ever, having led the Springboks to victory in 46 of the 64 games that he captained, a win percentage of 72%. He has won more tests as captain than any other Springbok has played as captain.
On 23 August 2010, he played his 100th Test – only the 15th player ever, and second South African to reach that milestone.

After his Springbok retirement his record as captain for the most international games was broken, by Ireland's Brian O'Driscoll in 2012 and New Zealand's Richie McCaw in 2013.

International tries

Clermont 
During the run-up to the 2007 Rugby World Cup, he was linked with the French club Clermont. He eventually signed a two-year deal with Clermont, effective after the World Cup. Despite his move to France, the South African Rugby Union announced on 20 February 2008 that he would retain his Boks captaincy. .

2009 British & Irish Lions tour 
Smit captained South Africa in their 2–1 series win over the British & Irish Lions.

South Africa Honours as Captain
Rugby World Cup
Champions: 2007

Tri Nations
Winners: 2004, 2009
Runners-up: 2005

References

External links

 John Smit's Blog
 Sharks Rugby profile
 Springbok Hall of Fame

1978 births
Alumni of Pretoria Boys High School
Living people
People from Polokwane
Rugby union hookers
Rugby union props
Afrikaner people
South African people of Dutch descent
Saracens F.C. players
Sharks (rugby union) players
South African rugby union players
South Africa international rugby union players
South Africa national rugby union team captains
Sharks (Currie Cup) players
Barbarian F.C. players
ASM Clermont Auvergne players
World Rugby Hall of Fame inductees
South African expatriate rugby union players
Expatriate rugby union players in England
South African expatriate sportspeople in England
Rugby union players from Limpopo